Idir Ouali (born 21 May 1988) is a French professional footballer who plays as a midfielder for Belgian club Olympic Charleroi.

Club career
Ouali began his career in the junior ranks of amateur club SCO Roubaix 59 in his native Roubaix. At age 15, his math teacher at the time recommended that he try out for Mouscron's academy, Futurosport, which was a short distance away across the Belgian border. Ouali took his advice and was admitted into the club shortly after.

Mouscron
Ouali progressed through the junior ranks of RE Mouscron, and on 27 January 2007 he made his professional debut for the club in a league game against Gent.

On 8 March 2008, Ouali started his first league game for the club against Brugge, scoring a goal in the 2–0 win. The following week, he started and scored again, this time against Charleroi. After scoring two goals in his first 2 starts for Mouscron, he was signed on 16 March 2008 to a two-year contract extension until 2010. On 14 September 2008, Ouali scored a hat-trick in a league game against Kortrijk.

On 22 December 2008, it was reported that Ouali was joining Standard Liège for a fee of €400,000. However, the transfer did not go through because of Mouscron's refusal to sell after the news of the transfer was leaked to the press before its completion.

On 28 December 2009, Mouscron were kicked out of the Belgian First Division and relegated to the Third Division after facing financial difficulties and going into administration. All the first team players of the club became free agents and were free to sign with other clubs. On 1 January 2010, Ouali went on trial with Ligue 1 side FC Sochaux. However, on 7 January 2010, it was reported that Ouali was close to signing with another Ligue 1 side, Le Mans.

Le Mans
On 8 January 2010, Ouali signed a two-and-a-half-year contract with Le Mans FC.

Dynamo Dresden
On 24 July 2012, Ouali signed a two-year contract with Dynamo Dresden. Despite the club's on-field struggles, finishing 16th and 17th in Ouali's two years at the club, he enjoyed a successful spell and reached good form. His pace caused problems for opposition defences as he established himself as an important first-team player.

SC Paderborn
Following Dynamo Dresden's relegation from the 2. Bundesliga in the 2013–14 season, Ouali signed a three-year contract with SC Paderborn 07, and represented them in the Bundesliga for the 2014–15 season. Paderborn were relegated to the 2. Bundesliga for the 2015–16 season.

Kortrijk
On 15 June 2016, Ouali joined Belgian club Kortrijk.

Hatayspor
On 5 August 2019, Ouali signed a contract with Turkish club Hatayspor.

Return to Belgium
In September 2022, Ouali returned to Belgium and signed with the third-tier Belgian National Division 1 club Olympic Charleroi.

International career
In May 2013, Ouali was selected by Algeria national team coach Vahid Halilhodžić as a reserve player for a pair of 2014 World Cup qualifiers against Benin and Rwanda.

Career statistics

References

External links 
 

1988 births
French sportspeople of Algerian descent
French people of Berber descent
French people of Kabyle descent
Kabyle people
Sportspeople from Roubaix
Footballers from Hauts-de-France
Living people
French footballers
Algerian footballers
Association football midfielders
Royal Excel Mouscron players
Le Mans FC players
Dynamo Dresden players
SC Paderborn 07 players
K.V. Kortrijk players
Hatayspor footballers
Ethnikos Achna FC players
Bahla Club players
R. Olympic Charleroi Châtelet Farciennes players
Belgian Pro League players
Ligue 1 players
Ligue 2 players
Bundesliga players
2. Bundesliga players
Süper Lig players
TFF First League players
Cypriot First Division players
Belgian National Division 1 players
Algerian expatriate footballers
French expatriate footballers
Expatriate footballers in Belgium
Expatriate footballers in Germany
Expatriate footballers in Cyprus
Expatriate footballers in Turkey
Expatriate footballers in Oman
French expatriate sportspeople in Germany
French expatriate sportspeople in Belgium
French expatriate sportspeople in Cyprus
French expatriate sportspeople in Turkey
French expatriate sportspeople in Oman
Algerian expatriate sportspeople in Germany
Algerian expatriate sportspeople in Belgium
Algerian expatriate sportspeople in Cyprus
Algerian expatriate sportspeople in Turkey
Algerian expatriate sportspeople in Oman